The United Arab Emirates Space Agency (UAESA) ( translit: wikālat al-Imārāt l-lifaḍā') is the space agency of the United Arab Emirates government responsible for the development of the country's space industry. It was created in 2014 and is responsible for developing and regulating the space sector in the UAE.

The agency is charged with the growth of the sector through partnerships, academic programmes and investments in R&D, commercial initiatives, and driving space science research and exploration.

History
The UAE proposed in 2008 to establish a Pan-Arab Space Agency, as a civilian project like the European Space Agency (ESA). The Arab Science and Technology Foundation said an agency for the Middle East and North Africa already had unofficial support from some governments and hoped that a regional organisation for disseminating satellite images could form an early foundation. The agency would monitor security and environmental changes with equatorial satellites. It would not develop its own launch capability, as that was commercially available.
The proposed regional agency would reduce the cost of putting satellites into orbit and pool talent and research. Plans were submitted to the region's governments and pushed for at the Global Space Technology Forum in December 2009. The UAE had already launched satellites and established an Earth Observation Space Center in Abu Dhabi.
However, little progress to establish the regional agency was made after the proposal.

The United Arab Emirates Space Agency was then established in 2014 by presidential decree.

In 2015, it formed a partnership with the Centre national d'études spatiales of France, as well as with the UK Space Agency.

Budget
The space agency has gathered about $5.2 billion of funding from government, private, and semi-private entities.

Strategic programme 
The Agency's strategic goals were announced in May 2015 and include:
 Develop and guide a world-class national space sector that supports sustainable development. 
 Promote scientific research and innovation to support progress in space sciences and technologies. 
 Attract and promote young Emiratis to become space scientists and technology pioneers. 
 Build and enhance international co-operation and partnership to provide administrative services with high quality standards and transparency.

UAE Space Agency initiatives 

The Agency is involved in directing, investing in, and promoting a number of initiatives. The UAE has launched prior to the existence of the Agency commercial satellites constructed by EADS (YahSat 1A and 1B), Boeing (Thuraya 1, 2 and 3) and MBRSC DubaiSat-1 and DubaiSat-2, developed as part of a technology transfer programme with South Korea's Satrec Initiative, resulting in an existing space sector investment of some $5.5 billion.

Space Science Research Centre, Al-Ain 
The $27 million Al-Ain based Space Research Centre was announced on 25 May 2015. The centre is intended as an incubator for space research, development, and innovation. It will be involved in coordinating with a number of agencies, including the Emirates Mobile Observatory.

Emirates Mars Mission 

The Emirates Mars Mission is being undertaken by the Mohammed bin Rashid Space Centre, a Government of Dubai entity. The UAE successfully launched the Mars Hope mission to Mars on 19 July, 2020. Mission goals include creating the first holistic diurnal picture of Mars' atmosphere with three science instruments mounted on an orbiter which is aimed to reach Mars orbit in early 2021. On 9 February 2021, it successfully put its probe into orbit around Mars. The Centre employs 75 people which the UAE government hopes to double by 2022.

Emirates Lunar Mission 

On 29 September, 2020, Dubai's ruler, Sheikh Mohammed bin Rashid Al Maktoum announced the UAE's uncrewed mission to the Moon in 2024, as the country was seeking to expand its space sector. Sheikh Mohammed also said that the rover named "Rashid", after his father who is credited with modernizing Dubai, will cover "areas not yet reached in previous exploration missions".

Graduate degree programme in Advanced Space Science 
In May 2015, an MoU was signed by Al Yah Satellite Communications Company (Yahsat), the Masdar Institute of Science and Technology and Orbital ATK Inc to create a Degree Programme in Advanced Space Science, the first such course of study in the Middle East. These three entities, with co-ordination and oversight from the UAE Space Agency, will launch the academic programme at Masdar Institute.

Space tourism
The space agency is working to bring space tourism to UAE from Al Ain International Airport serving as a potential space port for the agency.

See also
 Sarah Al Amiri
 List of government space agencies

References

Space program of the United Arab Emirates
Space agencies
2014 establishments in the United Arab Emirates
Government agencies established in 2014